Happiness is Just a Little Thing Called a Rolls-Royce is an American play.

The play was profiled in the William Goldman book The Season: A Candid Look at Broadway.

References

External links
 

1968 plays